Araskonay-e Sofla (also Romanized as Āraskonāy-e Soflá; also known as Arāzgūnī-ye Pā’īn, Ārāzgūnī-ye Soflá, and Arsagonā-ye Soflá) is a village in Charuymaq-e Jonubegharbi Rural District, in the Central District of Charuymaq County, East Azerbaijan Province, Iran. At the 2006 census, its population was 139, in 24 families.

References 

Populated places in Charuymaq County